Barinthus can refer to:
Manannan Mac Lir, sea and weather god from Irish mythology
Barvitus, supposed saint
Barinthus, a character in the "Merry Gentry" series of books by Laurell K. Hamilton